These 561 species belong to the genus Platygaster, platygastrids.

Platygaster species

 Platygaster aberrans Buhl, 1998
 Platygaster abia Walker, 1836
 Platygaster abicollis MacGown & Osgood, 1971
 Platygaster abisares Walker, 1836
 Platygaster aboriginalis Buhl, 2004
 Platygaster abrupta Buhl, 1994
 Platygaster acciculosis Drake, 1970
 Platygaster aciculata Ashmead, 1893
 Platygaster acrisius Walker, 1836
 Platygaster actinomeridis (Ashmead, 1893)
 Platygaster acuticlava Buhl, 1998
 Platygaster acutocularis Buhl, 1998
 Platygaster aebeloeensis Buhl, 2001
 Platygaster aegeus Walker, 1836
 Platygaster affinis Fouts, 1925
 Platygaster alnicola (Ashmead, 1893)
 Platygaster alticola Kieffer, 1910
 Platygaster ambositrensis Risbec, 1955
 Platygaster americana (Ashmead, 1887)
 Platygaster aneurus (Provancher, 1887)
 Platygaster angulata (Ashmead, 1893)
 Platygaster angustula (Thomson, 1859)
 Platygaster anopediana Buhl, 2005
 Platygaster anormis (Brues, 1910)
 Platygaster antennariae (Ashmead, 1893)
 Platygaster anura Fouts, 1925
 Platygaster aphidis Ashmead, 1893
 Platygaster apicalis Thomson, 1859
 Platygaster applanata Buhl, 2001
 Platygaster appropinquata Buhl, 2006
 Platygaster aptera Nees, 1834
 Platygaster armata Buhl, 2017
 Platygaster artemisiae (Ashmead, 1893)
 Platygaster ashmeadiana Huggert, 1973
 Platygaster asiatica Buhl, 2004
 Platygaster astericola (Ashmead, 1893)
 Platygaster asynaptae (Ashmead, 1893)
 Platygaster ater Buhl, 2011
 Platygaster athamas Walker, 1836
 Platygaster atrae Fouts, 1924
 Platygaster atriplicis (Ashmead, 1893)
 Platygaster attenuata Walker, 1836
 Platygaster australis (Dodd, 1916)
 Platygaster automenes Walker, 1839
 Platygaster baccharicola (Ashmead, 1887)
 Platygaster baccharidis Kieffer & Jörgensen, 1910
 Platygaster baezi Buhl, 2003
 Platygaster baloghi Buhl, 2004
 Platygaster basi Vlug, 1995
 Platygaster beneficiens MacGown, 1979
 Platygaster betulae (Kieffer, 1916)
 Platygaster betularia Kieffer, 1916
 Platygaster biroi Buhl, 2004
 Platygaster blascozumetae Buhl, 1998
 Platygaster bonessi Buhl, 2000
 Platygaster boneti Buhl, 2006
 Platygaster borealis Buhl, 1998
 Platygaster brachyptera Buhl, 2004
 Platygaster brevicornis Förster, 1861
 Platygaster brevipetiolata Buhl, 2004
 Platygaster brevistriata Kieffer, 1916
 Platygaster bucolion Walker, 1836
 Platygaster bureschi Szabó, 1959
 Platygaster burkei (Rohwer, 1917)
 Platygaster californica (Ashmead, 1893)
 Platygaster canestrinii (Rondani, 1866)
 Platygaster caninifrons (Brues, 1910)
 Platygaster caryae Ashmead, 1893
 Platygaster caulicola Kieffer & Jörgensen, 1910
 Platygaster cebes Walker, 1836
 Platygaster cecconii Kieffer, 1913
 Platygaster cecidomyiae Ratzeburg, 1852
 Platygaster cenone Fouts
 Platygaster chaos 
 Platygaster chilensis (Brèthes, 1915)
 Platygaster chloropus Thomson, 1859
 Platygaster chrysippus Walker, 1836
 Platygaster ciliata Buhl & Choi, 2006
 Platygaster clavata Buhl, 1994
 Platygaster cochleata Walker, 1836
 Platygaster coloradensis (Ashmead, 1893)
 Platygaster columbiana Fouts, 1924
 Platygaster compressa Fouts, 1934
 Platygaster compressicornis (Thomson, 1859)
 Platygaster compressiventris (Ashmead, 1893)
 Platygaster confinis Thomson, 1859
 Platygaster consobrina Kieffer, 1913
 Platygaster contorticornis Ratzeburg, 1844
 Platygaster convergens Kieffer, 1913
 Platygaster coorgensis (Mukerjee, 1978)
 Platygaster corcyrana Buhl, 1996
 Platygaster corni Kieffer, 1916
 Platygaster coronata (Brues, 1910)
 Platygaster corvina Förster, 1861
 Platygaster costaricae Buhl, 2003
 Platygaster cottei Kieffer, 1913
 Platygaster crassa (Kryger & Schmiedeknecht, 1938)
 Platygaster crassicornis Buhl, 1998
 Platygaster crenulata Buhl, 2004
 Platygaster cruciferarum Kieffer, 1916
 Platygaster csoszi Buhl, 2004
 Platygaster cuspidata Buhl, 2005
 Platygaster cynipicola (Ashmead, 1893)
 Platygaster cyrsilus Walker, 1836
 Platygaster dalgaardi Buhl, 2006
 Platygaster damokles Buhl, 1998
 Platygaster danica Buhl, 1999
 Platygaster danielssoni Buhl, 1998
 Platygaster danyiensis Buhl, 2014
 Platygaster davei Buhl, 2010
 Platygaster deipyla Walker, 1836
 Platygaster delyi Buhl, 2006
 Platygaster demades Walker, 1836
 Platygaster dentata Buhl, 2001
 Platygaster denticulata Buhl, 2001
 Platygaster depressiventris Thomson, 1859
 Platygaster dictys Walker, 1836
 Platygaster dilata Buhl, 2001
 Platygaster diplosidis (Ashmead, 1893)
 Platygaster diplosisae Risbec, 1956
 Platygaster disincta Fouts
 Platygaster distincta Fouts, 1926
 Platygaster dombeyae Risbec, 1953
 Platygaster draskovitsi Buhl, 2006
 Platygaster dryomiae Dieuzeide, 1927
 Platygaster dryope Walker, 1836
 Platygaster dubia (Ashmead, 1894)
 Platygaster elissa Walker, 1839
 Platygaster elongata Haliday, 1833
 Platygaster ennius Walker, 1836
 Platygaster ensifer (Westwood, 1833)
 Platygaster entwistlei Buhl, 1997
 Platygaster equestris Spittler, 1969
 Platygaster ericeti Rondani, 1877
 Platygaster eriphyle Walker, 1836
 Platygaster errans Fouts, 1924
 Platygaster eryngii Kieffer, 1916
 Platygaster estonica Buhl, 2004
 Platygaster ethiopica Buhl, 2004
 Platygaster etsuhoae Buhl, 1998
 Platygaster eucalyptodiplosisae Buhl, 2017
 Platygaster euhemerus Walker, 1836
 Platygaster eurotiae (Ashmead, 1893)
 Platygaster euurae (Ashmead, 1893)
 Platygaster euxestonotoides Buhl, 1998
 Platygaster exiguae Fouts, 1926
 Platygaster felti Fouts, 1920
 Platygaster fennica Buhl, 2003
 Platygaster filicaudis Fouts, 1925
 Platygaster filicornis Walker, 1836
 Platygaster flabellata Buhl, 2003
 Platygaster flagellata Buhl, 2003
 Platygaster flavifemorata Buhl & Choi, 2006
 Platygaster flavitarsis Fouts, 1926
 Platygaster floridensis Ashmead, 1887
 Platygaster foersteri (Gahan, 1919)
 Platygaster formicarum Kieffer, 1916
 Platygaster forshagei Buhl, 2006
 Platygaster foutsi Huggert, 1973
 Platygaster frater Buhl, 2006
 Platygaster fumipennis Fouts, 1924
 Platygaster funesta Motschulsky, 1852
 Platygaster fungicola Kieffer, 1916
 Platygaster fusca Buhl, 2004
 Platygaster fuscalis Buhl, 2011
 Platygaster fuscipennis Fouts, 1924
 Platygaster gahani Fouts, 1924
 Platygaster gaia Buhl, 2004
 Platygaster galbus Ushakumari, 2004
 Platygaster galenus Walker, 1836
 Platygaster gambiana Buhl, 2006
 Platygaster genata Buhl, 1998
 Platygaster generalii Rondani, 1866
 Platygaster germanica Buhl, 1998
 Platygaster gifuensis (Ashmead, 1904)
 Platygaster glemhornae Buhl, 2010
 Platygaster globicola Kieffer & Jörgensen, 1910
 Platygaster gorge Walker, 1836
 Platygaster gorgo Walker, 1839
 Platygaster gracilicornis (Ashmead, 1894)
 Platygaster gracilipes Huggert, 1975
 Platygaster gracilis Ashmead
 Platygaster gyge Walker, 1836
 Platygaster gyrone Szelényi, 1958
 Platygaster hanseni Buhl, 2006
 Platygaster hanssoniana Buhl, 2003
 Platygaster harpagoceras 
 Platygaster henkvlugi Buhl, 1996
 Platygaster hera Buhl, 1998
 Platygaster herricki Packard, 1880
 Platygaster heterothalami Kieffer & Jörgensen, 1910
 Platygaster hiemalis Forbes, 1888
 Platygaster hoffmeyeri Buhl, 2006
 Platygaster hovmoelleri Buhl, 2006
 Platygaster huachucae (Ashmead, 1893)
 Platygaster huggerti Buhl, 2001
 Platygaster hyalinata (Thomson, 1859)
 Platygaster hyalinipennis (Ashmead, 1887)
 Platygaster hybrida Buhl, 1994
 Platygaster hyemalis Curtis, 1830
 Platygaster hygrophila Kieffer, 1916
 Platygaster iberica Buhl, 1998
 Platygaster ilona Szabó, 1976
 Platygaster imlaci Buhl, 1997
 Platygaster inconspicua Buhl, 1999
 Platygaster indefinita Buhl, 2006
 Platygaster inderdaadi Vlug, 1995
 Platygaster indica Mukerjee, 1978
 Platygaster inermis Walker, 1836
 Platygaster ingeniosus Matsuo & Yamagishi, 2018
 Platygaster insularis (Ashmead, 1894)
 Platygaster intermedia Buhl, 2006
 Platygaster intermedius Ushakumari, 2004
 Platygaster iolas Walker, 1836
 Platygaster iteocrypta Kieffer, 1916
 Platygaster iteophila (Kieffer, 1916)
 Platygaster javieri Buhl, 1998
 Platygaster juniperella MacGown, 1979
 Platygaster juniperi MacGown, 1979
 Platygaster juniperina MacGown, 1979
 Platygaster jutlandica Buhl, 2006
 Platygaster kalmiae Fouts, 1925
 Platygaster karlssoni Buhl, 2010
 Platygaster kaszabi Buhl, 2004
 Platygaster kenyana Buhl, 2004
 Platygaster keralicus Ushakumari, 2004
 Platygaster kimballi MacGown, 1974
 Platygaster komugi Ishii, 1953
 Platygaster koponeni Buhl, 2003
 Platygaster koreana Buhl, 2006
 Platygaster krarupi Buhl, 1995
 Platygaster kui Choi & Buhl, 2006
 Platygaster laevicollis (Ashmead, 1893)
 Platygaster laevifrons Buhl, 2002
 Platygaster laeviventris Thomson, 1859
 Platygaster lamelliformis Huggert, 1973
 Platygaster lampronota Fouts, 1924
 Platygaster lanceolata Buhl, 1996
 Platygaster lapponica Thomson, 1859
 Platygaster laricis Haliday, 1836
 Platygaster lasiopterae Kieffer & Jörgensen, 1910
 Platygaster lasiorum Kieffer, 1916
 Platygaster lata Förster, 1861
 Platygaster latescens (Brues, 1910)
 Platygaster laticeps Thomson, 1859
 Platygaster laticlavus (Ashmead, 1894)
 Platygaster laticornis Buhl, 2004
 Platygaster latifrons Huggert, 1973
 Platygaster latiptera Buhl, 2010
 Platygaster leguminicolae Fouts, 1920
 Platygaster leileri Buhl, 2007
 Platygaster leptines Walker, 1836
 Platygaster leptoptera Buhl, 1998
 Platygaster leptosoma Buhl, 2006
 Platygaster leucanthemi (Kieffer, 1916)
 Platygaster libocedri MacGown, 1974
 Platygaster liga Buhl, 2014
 Platygaster linearis Fouts, 1924
 Platygaster lineaticeps Buhl, 1994
 Platygaster litoralis Buhl, 1998
 Platygaster lobata Buhl, 2014
 Platygaster longestriata Kieffer, 1916
 Platygaster longestriolata Thomson, 1859
 Platygaster longicaudata Kieffer, 1906
 Platygaster lubomasneri Buhl, 1995
 Platygaster lucida Fouts, 1924
 Platygaster luctuosa Kieffer & Herbst, 1911
 Platygaster lugens Kieffer, 1926
 Platygaster lundensis Buhl, 1997
 Platygaster lupinicola (Ashmead, 1893)
 Platygaster luteocoxalis (Kozlov, 1966)
 Platygaster lyciicola Kieffer & Jörgensen, 1910
 Platygaster lyneborgi Buhl, 1998
 Platygaster lysicles Walker, 1836
 Platygaster maarteni Vlug, 1995
 Platygaster macgowni Buhl, 2001
 Platygaster macroptera Buhl, 2004
 Platygaster mahensis Kieffer, 1912
 Platygaster mainensis MacGown & Osgood, 1971
 Platygaster malabarica (Mukerjee, 1978)
 Platygaster malaisei Buhl, 2005
 Platygaster malpighii Kieffer, 1916
 Platygaster mandrakae Risbec, 1955
 Platygaster manto Walker, 1836
 Platygaster marchali Kieffer, 1906
 Platygaster marginata Thomson, 1859
 Platygaster martikaineni Buhl, 2003
 Platygaster marttii Buhl, 2003
 Platygaster marylandica Fouts, 1924
 Platygaster masneri Huggert, 1975
 Platygaster matsutama Yoshida & Hirashima, 1979
 Platygaster matuschanskavaskyi Buhl, 2003
 Platygaster mayetiolae Kieffer, 1916
 Platygaster mayi Buhl, 2017
 Platygaster mediocris (Brues, 1910)
 Platygaster meduxnekeagensis Buhl, 2006
 Platygaster melanocera (Ashmead, 1887)
 Platygaster melliscapus (Ashmead, 1893)
 Platygaster meridionalis (Ashmead, 1894)
 Platygaster micromma Buhl, 2010
 Platygaster microsculpturata Buhl, 1999
 Platygaster minima (Mukerjee, 1978)
 Platygaster minthe Walker, 1836
 Platygaster minuta Zetterstedt, 1840
 Platygaster minutissima Fouts, 1925
 Platygaster minutula Dalla Torre, 1898
 Platygaster mirabilis (Ashmead, 1893)
 Platygaster misella Buhl, 2006
 Platygaster moczari Szabó, 1976
 Platygaster modesta Buhl, 1998
 Platygaster molsensis Buhl, 1995
 Platygaster mongolica Buhl, 2004
 Platygaster mumfordi Fouts, 1934
 Platygaster munita Walker, 1836
 Platygaster munki Buhl, 1994
 Platygaster muscivora Risbec, 1950
 Platygaster myrmecobia Kieffer, 1913
 Platygaster narendrani Ushakumari, 2004
 Platygaster nashi Buhl & O'Connor, 2011
 Platygaster natalensis Buhl, 2003
 Platygaster nigeriana Buhl, 2004
 Platygaster nigerrimus (Kieffer, 1926)
 Platygaster nigra Nees von Esenbeck, 1834
 Platygaster nigricoxa Fouts, 1925
 Platygaster nigrifemur (Ashmead, 1890)
 Platygaster nigripes Ratzeburg, 1852
 Platygaster nigrita Buhl, 2004
 Platygaster nigrocoxatus Ushakumari, 2004
 Platygaster nisus Walker, 1836
 Platygaster nodicola (Kieffer, 1916)
 Platygaster noonae Buhl, 1995
 Platygaster norvegica Kieffer, 1913
 Platygaster nottoni Buhl, 1995
 Platygaster novaezealandiae Buhl, 2011
 Platygaster noveboracensis (Brues, 1910)
 Platygaster oblonga Buhl, 2005
 Platygaster obscura Nees von Esenbeck, 1834
 Platygaster obscuripennis Ashmead, 1893
 Platygaster oculata Buhl, 2004
 Platygaster oebalus Walker, 1836
 Platygaster oeclus Walker, 1836
 Platygaster oenone Fouts, 1925
 Platygaster oleae Szelényi, 1940
 Platygaster opaca Ruthe, 1859
 Platygaster orcus Walker, 1836
 Platygaster ornata Kieffer, 1906
 Platygaster orus Walker, 1836
 Platygaster oryzae Cameron, 1891
 Platygaster oscus Walker, 1836
 Platygaster otandjoboliensis Buhl, 2014
 Platygaster otanes Walker, 1836
 Platygaster oviventris Buhl, 2004
 Platygaster paches Walker, 1842
 Platygaster pallida Fouts, 1925
 Platygaster pallidicoxalis (Ashmead, 1894)
 Platygaster pallipes (Ashmead, 1890)
 Platygaster panamaensis Buhl, 2002
 Platygaster panchganii Mani, 1975
 Platygaster pappi Buhl, 2004
 Platygaster parallela Walker, 1835
 Platygaster parvula Zetterstedt, 1840
 Platygaster pauliani Risbec, 1953
 Platygaster pedasus Walker, 1836
 Platygaster pedestris Buhl, 2004
 Platygaster pelias Walker, 1836
 Platygaster pentatoma (Ashmead, 1893)
 Platygaster perineti Risbec, 1953
 Platygaster perplexa Fouts, 1925
 Platygaster persicariae Kieffer, 1906
 Platygaster philinna Walker, 1836
 Platygaster philippiae Risbec, 1953
 Platygaster phragmitiphila Buhl, 2006
 Platygaster phragmitis (Schrank, 1781)
 Platygaster picipes Förster, 1861
 Platygaster pilco Sundholm, 1970
 Platygaster pinaensis Buhl, 1998
 Platygaster pini Fouts
 Platygaster pinicola (Ashmead, 1893)
 Platygaster piniphila MacGown, 1979
 Platygaster pinyonicola MacGown, 1979
 Platygaster piso Sundholm, 1970
 Platygaster plana Buhl, 1994
 Platygaster planivertex Buhl, 2014
 Platygaster planoides Buhl, 1995
 Platygaster platyptera Buhl, 2005
 Platygaster pleuron Walker, 1836
 Platygaster plotina Walker, 1836
 Platygaster pluto (Ashmead, 1887)
 Platygaster podocarpi Buhl, 2015
 Platygaster polaszeki Buhl, 2004
 Platygaster polita Thomson, 1859
 Platygaster politiceps Buhl, 2013
 Platygaster ponderosae MacGown, 1979
 Platygaster praecox Buhl, 1999
 Platygaster producta MacGown, 1979
 Platygaster prolata MacGown, 1971
 Platygaster propucta Macgown
 Platygaster proxima (Ashmead, 1893)
 Platygaster pruni 
 Platygaster pseudotsugae MacGown, 1979
 Platygaster pubiventris Buhl, 2005
 Platygaster puccinii Vlug, 1995
 Platygaster punctiventris Buhl, 2006
 Platygaster pygmaea Kieffer, 1913
 Platygaster pyramidalis Nees von Esenbeck, 1834
 Platygaster quadriceps Buhl, 2006
 Platygaster quadrifarius (Kieffer, 1916)
 Platygaster ramachandrai (Rao, 1950)
 Platygaster relativa Fouts, 1924
 Platygaster resinosae MacGown, 1979
 Platygaster retuertae Buhl, 1998
 Platygaster reyi Buhl, 2001
 Platygaster rhabdophagae MacGown, 1979
 Platygaster riparia Yamagishi, 1980
 Platygaster robertensis Buhl, 2017
 Platygaster robiniae Buhl & Duso, 2008
 Platygaster rohweri Fouts, 1924
 Platygaster romanica Popovici & Buhl, 2005
 Platygaster rossinii Vlug, 1995
 Platygaster rubi (Ashmead, 1893)
 Platygaster ruficornis (Latreille, 1805)
 Platygaster rufidens Fouts, 1925
 Platygaster rufitibia Buhl, 1999
 Platygaster rugosiceps Buhl, 1994
 Platygaster rutilipes Buhl, 1997
 Platygaster rutubus Walker, 1836
 Platygaster rwankwiensis Risbec, 1958
 Platygaster sagana Walker, 1836
 Platygaster salicicola (Ashmead, 1893)
 Platygaster saliciperdae Kieffer, 1913
 Platygaster salvadorae Rao, 1950
 Platygaster sambuci (Kieffer, 1916)
 Platygaster sasii Ushakumari, 2004
 Platygaster satara Mani, 1975
 Platygaster scorpoides Muesebeck & Walkley, 1951
 Platygaster scotica Kieffer, 1913
 Platygaster scrophulariae (Kieffer, 1916)
 Platygaster sculptiventris Buhl, 2007
 Platygaster scutellator Fouts, 1925
 Platygaster semiflava Buhl, 2006
 Platygaster semiglabra (Girault, 1920)
 Platygaster setosa Buhl, 2003
 Platygaster shastensis Fouts, 1924
 Platygaster signata (Förster, 1861)
 Platygaster signe Buhl, 2006
 Platygaster similis MacGown, 1974
 Platygaster simplex (Brues, 1922)
 Platygaster singularis Buhl, 2006
 Platygaster sinica Buhl, 1996
 Platygaster sociabilis Kieffer & Jörgensen, 1910
 Platygaster soederlundi Buhl, 1998
 Platygaster solidaginis (Ashmead, 1887)
 Platygaster solodovnikovi Buhl, 2011
 Platygaster sonchis Walker, 1836
 Platygaster sophianae Szabó, 1976
 Platygaster specularis Buhl, 1998
 Platygaster spiniger Nees, 1834
 Platygaster spinigera Nees von Esenbeck, 1834
 Platygaster splendens Sundholm, 1970
 Platygaster splendidula Ruthe, 1859
 Platygaster srilankensis Buhl, 2003
 Platygaster stachydis (Kieffer, 1916)
 Platygaster stefaniellae Buhl, 2000
 Platygaster stefaniolae Buhl, 1998
 Platygaster sterope Walker, 1836
 Platygaster stimulator Yamagishi, 1980
 Platygaster strato Walker, 1836
 Platygaster striaticeps (Ashmead, 1893)
 Platygaster striaticollis (Ashmead, 1893)
 Platygaster striatidorsum Buhl, 1998
 Platygaster striatifacies Buhl, 1996
 Platygaster striatifrons Fouts, 1925
 Platygaster striatipleura Buhl, 2004
 Platygaster striatitergitis Buhl, 1995
 Platygaster striatithorax Buhl, 1994
 Platygaster striolata Nees von Esenbeck, 1834
 Platygaster stylata Huggert, 1980
 Platygaster subanguliceps Buhl, 2014
 Platygaster subapicalis Buhl, 2006
 Platygaster subfilicornis Buhl, 2006
 Platygaster subparallela Buhl, 2017
 Platygaster subplana Buhl, 2005
 Platygaster subterranea (Kieffer, 1916)
 Platygaster subtilis Förster, 1861
 Platygaster subuliformis Kieffer, 1926
 Platygaster suecica (Kieffer, 1926)
 Platygaster sugitama Yoshida & Hirashima, 1979
 Platygaster sylea Walker, 1843
 Platygaster sylveni Buhl, 2009
 Platygaster szelenyii Huggert, 1975
 Platygaster tacita Fouts, 1925
 Platygaster tanus Ushakumari, 2004
 Platygaster taras Walker, 1836
 Platygaster taylori MacGown, 1974
 Platygaster tenerifensis Buhl, 2001
 Platygaster tengoei Buhl, 2010
 Platygaster tenuicornis Förster, 1861
 Platygaster tephrosiae 
 Platygaster terco Sundholm, 1970
 Platygaster texana Fouts, 1924
 Platygaster tibialis Kieffer, 1905
 Platygaster tisias Walker, 1836
 Platygaster topali Buhl, 2004
 Platygaster topaliana Buhl, 2004
 Platygaster transsylvanica (Szelényi, 1958)
 Platygaster transversiceps Buhl, 1998
 Platygaster tricarinata Buhl, 2014
 Platygaster tripotini Buhl & Choi, 2006
 Platygaster truncata Buhl, 2004
 Platygaster tschirnhausi Buhl, 2014
 Platygaster tsitsikamensis Buhl, 2005
 Platygaster tuberata Kieffer, 1916
 Platygaster tuberculatrix Buhl, 2011
 Platygaster tuberculi (Kieffer, 1916)
 Platygaster tuberosa Nees von Esenbeck, 1834
 Platygaster tuberosula Kieffer, 1926
 Platygaster tubulosa Brues, 1922
 Platygaster tumida (Ashmead, 1893)
 Platygaster tumoricola Kieffer & Jörgensen, 1910
 Platygaster ulmicola Kieffer, 1916
 Platygaster ungeri Buhl, 1999
 Platygaster uniformis Buhl, 2006
 Platygaster urnicola Yamagishi, 1980
 Platygaster urniphila Matsuo & Yamagishi, 2018
 Platygaster utahensis (Ashmead, 1893)
 Platygaster uvulariae 
 Platygaster vaccinii 
 Platygaster vaenia Walker, 1836
 Platygaster vancouverensis (Ashmead, 1893)
 Platygaster variabilis Fouts, 1924
 Platygaster variarilis Fouts
 Platygaster varicornis Buhl, 1999
 Platygaster vedresi Szabó, 1977
 Platygaster vera Buhl, 1998
 Platygaster verdii Vlug, 1995
 Platygaster vernalis (Myers, 1917)
 Platygaster vernoniae (Ashmead, 1893)
 Platygaster verrucosa Kieffer, 1916
 Platygaster verticalis Buhl, 2003
 Platygaster vestina Walker, 1836
 Platygaster viburni Kieffer, 1916
 Platygaster victoriae MacGown, 1979
 Platygaster vintheri Buhl, 1994
 Platygaster virgo Day, 1971
 Platygaster viticola (Ashmead, 1893)
 Platygaster vitisiellae 
 Platygaster vitreus Buhl, 1997
 Platygaster vulgaris Buhl, 1998
 Platygaster walkerae Buhl, 2017
 Platygaster warda Buhl, 2004
 Platygaster websteri Fouts, 1924
 Platygaster xeneus Walker, 1838
 Platygaster yunnanensis Buhl, 2007
 Platygaster zambiana Buhl, 2007
 Platygaster zangherii Szelényi, 1955
 Platygaster zantanus Ushakumari, 2004
 Platygaster zaragozana Buhl, 1998
 Platygaster zavchanensis Buhl, 2004
 Platygaster zethus Walker, 1839
 Platygaster zosine Walker, 1836
 Polygnotus marchali

References

Platygaster
Platygastridae